Oscar Rizzato (28 February 1928 – 11 January 2021) was an Italian Catholic titular bishop.

Biography
Rizzato was born in San Giorgio delle Pertiche, Italy and was ordained to the priesthood in 1954. He was created titular bishop of Virunum and served as Papal Almoner to the Pope.

He died of complications from COVID-19 at Padua hospital on 11 January 2021, at age 91, during the COVID-19 pandemic in Italy. The funeral was celebrated by Bishop Claudio Cipolla on 16 January in the parish church of Arsego.

Notes

1928 births
2021 deaths
21st-century Italian titular bishops
Deaths from the COVID-19 pandemic in Veneto
People from the Province of Padua